The Tennessee state routes do not follow a systematic numbering system unlike the U.S. Highway System and some other states' highway systems. The routes are separated into primary and secondary routes though. Many of the routes are hidden in that they are overlaid on U.S. Routes and not signed. The mile markers throughout Tennessee, however, show the state route number for these hidden routes.

The Tennessee Department of Transportation (TDOT) maintains these routes under the "State Highways" title of state law, but designates them as "state routes". The triangle marker design was the only design until November 1983, when Tennessee divided its routes into primary routes and secondary or "arterial" routes with the adoption of a functional classification system, creating a primary marker and making the triangle marker the secondary marker; primary marker signs were posted in 1984.


List

See also
List of state routes in Tennessee shorter than one mile 
List of special state routes in Tennessee

References

Mileage retrieved from Delorme Street Atlas USA

External links
Tennessee Department of Transportation

 
State